The 1982 NCAA Division II Soccer Championship was the eleventh annual tournament held by the NCAA to determine the top men's Division II college soccer program in the United States.

Florida International defeated Southern Connecticut State in the final, 2–1, to win their first Division II national title. The Panthers (16-3-1) were coached by Karl Kremser.

The final match was played on December 4 at Florida International University in Miami, Florida.

Bracket

Final

See also  
 NCAA Division I Men's Soccer Championship
 NCAA Division III Men's Soccer Championship
 NAIA Men's Soccer Championship

References 

NCAA Division II Men's Soccer Championship
NCAA Division II Men's Soccer Championship
NCAA Division II Men's Soccer Championship
NCAA Division II Men's Soccer Championship
Soccer in Florida